Marc Gicquel and Jo-Wilfried Tsonga were the defending champions, but Tsonga chose not to participate that year.
Gicquel partnered with Jérémy Chardy, and won in the final against Lukáš Dlouhý and Leander Paes, 6–3, 7–6(7–5).

Seeds

Draw

Draw

External links
Main Draw

Doubles